De Bezige Bij ("the busy bee") is one of the most important literary publishing companies in the Netherlands.

History
The poem was sold to raise money for Jewish children who were placed with Dutch families; when it was published, in the spring of 1943, Campert had already died in the Neuengamme concentration camp. When the German occupier rounded up students for the Arbeitseinsatz, Lubberhuizen hid in the attic of Maarten Vink, a surgeon, and ran the press from there.

The name is derived from one of Lubberhuizen's aliases, "Bas." After he had signed a note, "Bas (busy)," an English-speaking friend joked, "Bas, busy as a bee can be," which led to the current name.

In 1997, De Bezige Bij became part of the Weekbladpersgroep, though it was to keep its editorial independence and its cooperative structure.

In 2020, all employees of the Thomas Rap publisher left De Bezige Bij for more autonomy.

Writers and poets
Writers and poets published by De Bezige Bij include:
Remco Campert
Hugo Claus
Jan Cremer
Louis Ferron
W.F. Hermans
Erik Menkveld
Harry Mulisch
Gerard Reve
Jan Siebelink
Ruth Thomas
Simon Vinkenoog
 Tommy Wieringa
 Leon de Winter

References

Secondary literature

External links

1943 establishments in the Netherlands
Book publishing companies of the Netherlands
Literary publishing companies
Mass media in Amsterdam